Heterolocha is a genus of moths in the family Geometridae described by Julius Lederer in 1853.

Species
 Heterolocha aristonaria (Walker, 1860)
 Heterolocha arizana Wileman, 1910
 Heterolocha biplagiata Bastelberger, 1909
 Heterolocha coccinea Inoue, 1976
 Heterolocha falconaria (Walker, 1866)
 Heterolocha hypoleuca Hampson, 1907
 Heterolocha laminaria (Herrich-Schäffer, [1852])
 Heterolocha lilacina (Bastelberger, 1909)
 Heterolocha lonicerae Prout, 1926
 Heterolocha marginata Wileman, 1910
 Heterolocha patalata Felder & Rogenhofer, 1875
 Heterolocha phoenicotaeniata (Kollar, 1844)
 Heterolocha polymorpha West, 1929
 Heterolocha polymorphoides Holloway, 1993
 Heterolocha pyreniata (Walker, 1866)
 Heterolocha sabulosa (Bastelberger, 1909)
 Heterolocha stulta (Butler, 1879)
 Heterolocha subroseata Warren, 1894
 Heterolocha taiwana Wileman, 1910

References

Ourapterygini